The Hammer of God: A Novel about the Cure of Souls by Bo Giertz was first published in 1941 in Swedish as Stengrunden ("The Stone Foundation"). It has been translated into English in 1960, 1973 and 2005. The English-language title derives from the first part of the book, Herrens hammare ("The Hammer of the Lord").

It was filmed in 2007 and is available with Swedish and English subtitles.

Literature 
 The Hammer of God: A Novel about the Cure of Souls. Translated by Clifford Ansgar Nelson. Minneapolis: Augsburg Publishing, 2005. . Revised edition.

External links
 http://www.stengrunden.org, homepage of the filmatized version of The Hammer of Cross (Linked 5 January 2009 in turn to http://www.malmberg.org/stengrunden/.)

Christian novels
1941 Swedish novels
Swedish-language novels